Walhampton School is a coeducational private preparatory school situated in the hamlet of Walhampton, near Lymington, England. It is the result of the 1997 merger between Hordle House School, situated in Milford on Sea, and Walhampton School, which was based at the current site. The merged school was known as ’Hordle Walhampton’ until 2013, when it reverted to its previous name of 'Walhampton School'.

The Walhampton School was founded in 1948 by Mrs Audrey Brewer, who purchased the house and grounds from the Morrison family. In 1954 Brewer sold the school to John Bradfield who subsequently converted the enterprise into a charitable trust.

Hordle House School was founded in 1926 by the Reverend Ernest Whately-Smith, MC.

The school has approximately 400 children aged between 2 and 13.

Headship

Hordle House (founded 1926) 

 1926 Reverend Ernest Whately-Smith, MC
 1950 Peter Whately-Smith and John Whately-Smith, the surviving sons of the above, as joint headmasters
 1972 John Vernon
 1994 Henry Phillips

Walhampton (founded 1948) 

 1948 Mrs Audrey ('Dordie') Brewer as principal with Reverend Sidney Philip Hayllar as headmaster
 1954 John Bradfield and Peter Lawford as joint headmasters
 1969 John Bradfield (solely)
 1983 Andrew Robinson

Hordle Walhampton (formed by merger 1997) 
In May 1996, Walhampton's board of governors announced the appointment of Adrian Gobat to succeed Andrew Robinson on his retirement. On 1 September 1997, Hordle House and Walhampton merged to form Hordle Walhampton School based at the Walhampton site. Adrian Gobat represented Walhampton as principal of the merged entity with Hordle House's headmaster, Henry Phillips, as headmaster.

 Sep 1997 Adrian Gobat as principal with Henry Philips as headmaster
 Dec 1997 Henry Philips (solely)
 2012 Titus Mills

Walhampton (renamed 2013) 
In 2013 Hordle Walhampton changed its name to Walhampton.

 (continued) Titus Mills
 Jan 2021 Jonny Timms

Notable Former Pupils (ordered by date of birth)

Charles Rob, MC (1913–2001), British surgeon
Captain Peter Hardinge RN, MBE (1915-1987), Royal Navy officer
Major-General Anthony Stanton, OBE (1915-1988), Royal Artillery officer
Charles Beauclerk, 13th Duke of St Albans, OBE (1915–1988), English peer and British Army officer
John Vernon Rob, CMG (1915–1971), British diplomat and first British High Commissioner to Singapore; brother of Charles Rob (above)
Sir Iain MacRobert, 4th Bt of Douneside (1917–1941), WWII RAF pilot; a series of bomber and fighter planes were named after him and his two elder brothers
Sir Patrick Nairne, GCB MC PC (1921–2013), senior civil servant and Master of St Catherine's College, Oxford
Jeremy Howard-Williams, DFC (1922–1995), WWII fighter pilot and author of several books on the wartime RAF, crosswords, sailing and sail-making
Stephen de Mowbray (1925–2016), Secret Intelligence Service (MI6) counterintelligence officer
Brian Abel-Smith (1926–1996), British economist and political adviser
Derek Jarman (1942–1994), film director and pioneering gay rights activist
Anthony Inglis (born 1952), British conductor; son of Jeremy Howard-Williams (above)
Ralph Douglas-Scott-Montagu, 4th Baron Montagu of Beaulieu (born 1961), English peer and President of the National Motor Museum Trust
Gerald Vernon-Jackson, CBE (born 1962), Liberal Democrat politician and leader of Portsmouth City Council
Rupert Goodman, FRGS DL (born 1963), British publisher, international affairs expert and entrepreneur
Paul Bliss (born 1964), music festival organiser
Mary Montagu-Scott, DL (born 1964), English designer, High Sheriff of Hampshire 2017–18, Deputy Lieutenant  of Hampshire 2018 and Commodore of the Beaulieu River Sailing Club

Notable Former Members of Staff 

Rory Boyle (born 1951), Director of Music at Walhampton (1979–1988); now Professor of Composition at the Royal Conservatoire of Scotland

References

External links 
School Website
Profile on the ISC website

Boarding schools in Hampshire
Buildings and structures in Lymington
Preparatory schools in Hampshire